North Park Collegiate and Vocational School is a public secondary school (high school) located in Brantford, Ontario, Canada, that offers academic courses to students in grades 9 through 12.

See also
List of high schools in Ontario

References

External links
 

High schools in Brantford
1959 establishments in Ontario
Educational institutions established in 1959